Stagecoach in Newcastle is a bus company, and a division of Stagecoach North East. Stagecoach in Newcastle is the largest division of Stagecoach North East, and one of the three major bus operators in the city of Newcastle upon Tyne, alongside Arriva North East and Go North East. Stagecoach predominantly provide services within the city proper, with Arriva North East and Go North East's routes extending beyond the city into other parts of Tyne and Wear, Northumberland and County Durham.

Fleet and operations
Stagecoach Newcastle operate a fleet mainly consisting of vehicles manufactured by Alexander Dennis, with most recent deliveries consisting of Enviro 200 MMC single-deck and Enviro 400 MMC double-deck vehicles. Some older vehicles in the fleet were manufactured by MAN.

Most vehicles are branded in the former corporate livery, which was originally launched in 2000. It consists of a white livery, with a blue skirt, and red and orange swoops. The new Stagecoach livery was launched in January 2020, and features three different liveries, based on the type of service operated, these being local, long-distance and specialist.

Stagecoach in Newcastle operate services from two depots:

Slatyford: Slatyford Lane, Slatyford, Newcastle upon Tyne
Walkergate: Shields Road, Walkergate, Newcastle upon Tyne

Services
Stagecoach in Newcastle provides local services in and around Newcastle upon Tyne, with buses operating from two depots – Slatyford and Walkergate.

As of April 2022, the following routes are operated:

Other services 

Other Stagecoach services operating in the city belong to different subsidiaries including the X24 express service between Newcastle and Sunderland and X34 between Newcastle and Horsely Hill which are part of the  Stagecoach in Sunderland  brand; and the 685 Cross-Pennine route between Carlisle and Newcastle which is operated by Stagecoach Cumbria & North Lancashire.

Vehicle orders and deliveries 
In 2007, the first batch of Alexander Dennis Enviro 400 double-deckers were delivered to Newcastle – these being part of a £55 million group-wide order. The vehicles operate predominantly on the city's high-frequency routes: 1, 12, 22, 38, 39/40, 62/63 and X87/X88.

A further delivery in July 2011 saw Walkergate depot take delivery of twenty-six Alexander Dennis Enviro 400H double-deckers, as part of the government's green bus scheme. These buses initially served on routes 39 and 40 from their introduction, until turn of the new decade, when they were replaced by new Alexander Dennis Enviro 400 MMC double-deckers. The Enviro 400H now operate on other high-frequency routes in particular services 12 and 22.

In 2016, twenty-four Alexander Dennis Enviro 400 MMC double-decker buses were delivered for services 62 and 63 (operated by both Slatyford and Walkergate depots), with this delivery allowing for some of the Alexander Dennis Enviro 400 from the original 2007 order to leave the region. A further 23 were delivered for services 39 and 40 in January 2020 which include additional audio-visual next stop announcements with scrolling LED displays, free Wi-Fi and USB charging points.

Eighteen Alexander Dennis Enviro 200 MMC single-decker buses were also delivered in 2016, these being for routes 30, 31 and 36 (operated by Slatyford depot).

Night buses 
In September 2018, Stagecoach in Newcastle introduced weekend night buses on the following routes: N1, N30, N39, N40 and N88. These services were withdrawn in July 2019, owing to low usage.

The Seasider open-top service 
In 2019, the company launched The Seasider open-top service, which takes in the sights of the North East's coast. The route serves North Shields, Cullercoats, Tynemouth and Whitley Bay. The launch of the coastal service coincided with the end of the company's City Sightseeing franchising agreement, with the open top double-deckers being deployed onto this new route, in order to engage with a new customer base in North Tyneside.

Accidents and incidents

 On 31 December 2008, an Alexander Dennis Enviro 400 (19380; NK58 AEU) was de-roofed after it hit a Metro bridge at The Avenue, Wallsend, North Tyneside. The accident happened after the driver had taken a wrong turn, leading to minor injuries, and a brief Metro speed restriction. The vehicle returned to service six months later, in June 2009.
 On Monday 28 March 2011, an Alexander Dennis Enviro 400 (19151; NK07 HBL) suffered severe fire damage, after its engine caught fire in Killingworth, North Tyneside.

References

External links
 
 TravelNorthEast.co.uk (North East Public Transport Information)

Bus operators in Tyne and Wear
Employee-owned companies of the United Kingdom
Stagecoach Group bus operators in England